is a national highway connecting Toyohashi, Aichi and Ise, Mie in Japan.

Route data
Length: 
Origin: Toyohashi (originates at junction with Route 1)
Terminus: Ise (ends at Ise Shrine)
Major cities: Nishio, Nagoya, Yokkaichi and Tsu

History
4 December 1952 - Designated as First Class National Highway 23 (from Yokkaichi, Mie to Ise, Mie)
1 April 1965 - Designated as General National Highway 23 (from Yokkaichi, Mie to Ise, Mie)
1 April 1975 - The highway was extended with the addition of a section between Yokkaichi, Mie and Toyohashi, Aichi.

Intersects with

Aichi Prefecture
Mie Prefecture

References

023
Roads in Aichi Prefecture
Roads in Mie Prefecture